Matala (Mätäle) is a rural locality (a village) in Kubiyazovsky Selsoviet, Askinsky District, Bashkortostan, Russia. The population was 56 as of 2010. There are 2 streets.

Geography 
Matala is located 22 km southeast of Askino (the district's administrative centre) by road. Utyashino is the nearest rural locality.

References 

Rural localities in Askinsky District